"Ripple" is the sixth song on the Grateful Dead album American Beauty. It was released as the B-side to the single "Truckin'".

Background
Robert Hunter wrote this song in 1970 in London on the same afternoon he wrote "Brokedown Palace" and "To Lay Me Down" (reputedly drinking half a bottle of retsina in the process ). The song debuted August 18, 1970 at Fillmore West in San Francisco. Jerry Garcia wrote the music to this song.

"Ripple" has a similar melody to the gospel hymn "Because He Lives," which was published a year later. Both songs are similar to "Any Dream Will Do" from the Andrew Lloyd Webber-Tim Rice musical Joseph and the Amazing Technicolor Dreamcoat. However, in his book The Grateful Dead FAQ, writer Tony Sclafani points out that even though "Any Dream Will Do" was written in 1968, Garcia is unlikely to have heard it, because no recording was released until 1970.

In popular culture
A number of essays have been written analyzing and annotating this song.

The 1985 drama film Mask, with Cher and Eric Stoltz, features this song.

Reception 
In 2021, Rolling Stone ranked the song at number 334 in their updated list of the 500 Greatest Songs of All Time.

References

Grateful Dead songs
1970 singles
Songs written by Jerry Garcia
Songs with lyrics by Robert Hunter (lyricist)
Jane's Addiction songs
Warner Records singles